Finley High School is a government-funded co-educational comprehensive secondary day school, located in Finley in the Riverina region of New South Wales, Australia.

Established in 1961, the school enrolled approximately 360 students in 2018, from Year 7 to Year 12, of whom eight percent identified as Indigenous Australians and four percent were from a language background other than English. The school is operated by the NSW Department of Education; the principal is Jeff Ward.

Overview 
The school has an award-winning Show Team, which shows sheep and cattle. They also receive exceptional School Certificate and HSC results. The teaching staff at Finley High School have won many awards, the most recent of which was a Director General's award for excellence in education, awarded to the Principal Phillip Carroll in December 2007 who left at the end of 2009 to teach in Albury.

In 2013 Finley High School introduced the 'Senior College Model' for studying the HSC. This model stretches the HSC over two years, allowing students to do three subjects at double time in Year's Eleven and Twelve. In doing this the Year Eleven and Twelve students merge in classes providing bigger classes and thus more subject options for the students. This HSC model has been implemented in other schools throughout rural NSW; Corowa High School being one.

Notable alumni
 Billy BrownlessAustralian rules footballer
 Shane CrawfordAustralian rules footballer 
 Don Elgin track and field athlete; represented Australia at the Atlanta 1996, Sydney 2000 and Athens 2004 Paralympics
 Janet Englishbass guitarist; member of Spiderbait
 Rosalie Hamauthor, best known for The Dressmaker
 Tom HawkinsAustralian rules footballer 
 Mark Maher (aka Kram)singer-drummer; member of Spiderbait and later, solo artist
 Mark WhileyAustralian rules footballer
 Damian Whittyguitarist; member of Spiderbait

See also 

 List of government schools in New South Wales
 List of schools in the Riverina
 Education in Australia

References

External links

 
 NSW Schools website

Public high schools in New South Wales
Education in the Riverina
Educational institutions established in 1961
1961 establishments in Australia